The National Union of Printing, Bookbinding and Paper Workers (NUPBPW) was a British trade union.

History
The union was founded in 1921 as the National Union of Printing, Bookbinding, Machine Ruling and Paper Workers when the National Union of Bookbinders and Machine Rulers and the National Union of Printing and Paper Workers merged.  The Platen Printing Machine Minders' Society and the London Society of Machine Rulers soon also joined.  In 1926, its central London branch broke away, but rejoined in 1931.  In 1928, the union dropped "machine ruling" from its name.

By 1960, the union over 160,000 members.  Following mergers with several small unions, in 1966 it joined with the National Society of Operative Printers and Assistants to form the Society of Graphical and Allied Trades.

Leadership

General Secretaries
1921: Tom Newland
1938: Bill Spackman
1947: Bill Morrison
1961: Tom Smith

General Presidents
1921: George Harraway
1938: E. C. Hooker
1950: Cecil Sharp
1954: John Mackenzie

References

External links
Catalogue of the NUPBPW archives, held at the Modern Records Centre, University of Warwick
Catalogue of the Printing Machine Branch/Platen Printing Machine Minders' Society archives, held at the Modern Records Centre, University of Warwick

1921 establishments in the United Kingdom
1966 disestablishments in the United Kingdom
Defunct trade unions of the United Kingdom
Bookbinders' trade unions
Trade unions established in 1921
Trade unions disestablished in 1966
Trade unions based in London